León Herrera Esteban (1922–2003) was a Spanish military officer and politician. He served as the minister of information and tourism in the first cabinet of Carlos Arias Navarro in the period 1974–1975.

Early life and education
Herrera was born in Jaén on 4 July 1922. Following the Civil War he joined the Taxdir cavalry regiment with which he fought on various fronts. He graduated from the University of Granada in 1942 receiving a degree in law.

Career
Herrera joined the Ministry of Air and then, the Ministry of Finance in 1946. His political career began in 1962 when he was appointed director general in the Ministry of Information and Tourism which he held until 1969.

In 1972 Herrera was appointed president of the European Conference of Posts and Telecommunications and was in office until 1974. Next he was named the undersecretary of the Ministry of Interior. He became the minister of information and tourism on 19 October 1974 following the resignation of Pío Cabanillas Gallas. It was Herrera who announced the death of Francisco Franco on 20 November 1975. Herrera's term as the minister of information and tourism ended on 12 December 1975 in a cabinet reshuffle, and he was replaced by Adolfo Martín Gamero in the post.

Next Herrera was appointed government delegate to Telefónica company. In 1983 he was named general legal advisor to the Ministry of Defense. His other positions included the attorney to the Cortes for the province of Jaén, a member of the Royal Academy of Jurisprudence and a member of the Madrid Bar Association.

Personal life and death
Herrera died in Madrid on 24 September 2003.

He was the recipient of the Grand Cross of Naval Merit and the Grand Cross of the Order of Carlos III.

References

External links

20th-century Spanish lawyers
1922 births
2003 deaths
Information and tourism ministers of Spain
Government ministers during the Francoist dictatorship
People from Jaén, Spain
University of Granada alumni
Military personnel of the Spanish Civil War